Schwarzbach is a river of Bavaria, Germany. It is a right tributary of the Saalach near Schneizlreuth.

See also

List of rivers of Bavaria

Rivers of Bavaria
Rivers of Germany